The 2001–02 NBA season was the Raptors' 7th season in the National Basketball Association. During the off-season, the Raptors acquired All-Star center and 2-time NBA Champion Hakeem Olajuwon from the Houston Rockets. Throughout the season, All-Star guard and team captain Vince Carter struggled with a left knee injury, and managed to play just 60 games. Despite the injury, Carter averaged 24.7 points, 5.2 rebounds and 1.5 steals per game, and was still voted to play in the 2002 NBA All-Star Game, his third consecutive All-Star selection, but did not play due to his knee injury. The Raptors played solid basketball with a 29–21 record at the All-Star break. However, the team then suffered a 13-game losing streak, losing 17 of their next 18 games. They would then post a nine-game winning streak between March and April, winning 12 of their final 14 games of the season.

Despite losing Carter for the rest of the season and the playoffs, the Raptors finished with a 42–40 record, and finished third place in the Central Division, which allowed them to clinch a playoff spot, behind the efforts of their other team captain Antonio Davis, who averaged 14.5 points, 9.6 rebounds and 1.1 blocks per game. In addition, second-year forward Morris Peterson showed improvement averaging 14.0 points per game, while Alvin Williams provided the team with 11.8 points, 5.7 assists and 1.6 steals per game, Keon Clark contributed 11.3 points, 7.4 rebounds and 1.5 blocks per game, and Olajuwon provided with 7.1 points, 6.0 rebounds and 1.5 blocks per game. Toronto's season ended in the Eastern Conference First Round with a defeat to the Detroit Pistons in five hard-fought games.

Following the season, Olajuwon retired after eighteen seasons in the NBA. Meanwhile, Chris Childs re-signed as a free agent with his former team, the New Jersey Nets, while Clark signed with the Sacramento Kings, Tracy Murray was traded to the Los Angeles Lakers, and three-point specialist Dell Curry also retired.

NBA draft

Roster

Regular season

Standings

Record vs. opponents

Game log

|- bgcolor="ffcccc"
| 1
| October 30
| @ Orlando
| 
| Chris Childs (13)
| Antonio Davis (10)
| Vince Carter, Chris Childs (3)
| TD Waterhouse Centre16,088
| 0–1
|- bgcolor="ffcccc"
| 2
| October 31
| @ Miami
| 
| Vince Carter (20)
| Antonio Davis (15)
| Vince Carter (7)
| American Airlines Arena16,500
| 0–2

|- bgcolor="bbffbb"
| 3
| November 2
| Dallas
| 
| Vince Carter (25)
| Antonio Davis, Hakeem Olajuwon (8)
| Morris Peterson, Alvin Williams (8)
| Air Canada Centre19,800
| 1–2
|- bgcolor="bbffbb"
| 4
| November 4
| Indiana
| 
| Vince Carter (28)
| Hakeem Olajuwon (8)
| Chris Childs (9)
| Air Canada Centre18,825
| 2–2
|- bgcolor="bbffbb"
| 5
| November 7
| Golden State
| 
| Vince Carter (39)
| Antonio Davis (16)
| Vince Carter (6)
| Air Canada Centre18,887
| 3–2
|- bgcolor="bbffbb"
| 6
| November 10
| @ Utah
| 
| Vince Carter (43)
| Jerome Williams (9)
| Alvin Williams (12)
| Delta Center18,194
| 4–2
|- bgcolor="ffcccc"
| 7
| November 11
| @ Denver
| 
| Vince Carter (22)
| Antonio Davis (11)
| Alvin Williams (7)
| Pepsi Center13,735
| 4–3
|- bgcolor="ffcccc"
| 8
| November 13
| @ Sacramento
| 
| Vince Carter (23)
| Keon Clark (10)
| Alvin Williams (5)
| ARCO Arena17,317
| 4–4
|- bgcolor="bbffbb"
| 9
| November 14
| @ Golden State
| 
| Vince Carter (24)
| Keon Clark (9)
| Vince Carter, Alvin Williams (5)
| The Arena in Oakland18,269
| 5–4
|- bgcolor="bbffbb"
| 10
| November 16
| @ L.A. Clippers
| 
| Vince Carter (29)
| Hakeem Olajuwon (12)
| Alvin Williams (9)
| Staples Center18,964
| 6–4
|- bgcolor="bbffbb"
| 11
| November 18
| @ Phoenix
| 
| Vince Carter (31)
| Hakeem Olajuwon (12)
| Alvin Williams (7)
| America West Arena14,823
| 7–4
|- bgcolor="ffcccc"
| 12
| November 20
| Detroit
| 
| Vince Carter (28)
| Hakeem Olajuwon (20)
| Chris Childs (5)
| Air Canada Centre19,800
| 7–5
|- bgcolor="ffcccc"
| 13
| November 22
| Milwaukee
| 
| Vince Carter (26)
| Antonio Davis (11)
| Alvin Williams (7)
| Air Canada Centre19,800
| 7–6
|- bgcolor="bbffbb"
| 14
| November 23
| @ Boston
| 
| Keon Clark (19)
| Keon Clark (9)
| Vince Carter (6)
| FleetCenter18,624
| 8–6
|- bgcolor="bbffbb"
| 15
| November 25
| Philadelphia
| 
| Vince Carter (30)
| Keon Clark, Antonio Davis (10)
| Alvin Williams (7)
| Air Canada Centre19,800
| 9–6
|- bgcolor="bbffbb"
| 16
| November 29
| Memphis
| 
| Vince Carter (23)
| Antonio Davis (11)
| Vince Carter, Alvin Williams (7)
| Air Canada Centre19,800
| 10–6

|- bgcolor="bbffbb"
| 17
| December 1
| @ Atlanta
| 
| Vince Carter (19)
| Vince Carter, Keon Clark (10)
| Alvin Williams (9)
| Philips Arena18,628
| 11–6
|- bgcolor="ffcccc"
| 18
| December 2
| Boston
| 
| Vince Carter (17)
| Antonio Davis (12)
| Vince Carter (6)
| Air Canada Centre19,800
| 11–7
|- bgcolor="ffcccc"
| 19
| December 6
| @ Milwaukee
| 
| Vince Carter (26)
| Hakeem Olajuwon (14)
| Vince Carter (7)
| Bradley Center18,717
| 11–8
|- bgcolor="bbffbb"
| 20
| December 7
| Denver
| 
| Vince Carter (42)
| Vince Carter (15)
| Chris Childs, Alvin Williams (7)
| Air Canada Centre19,800
| 12–8
|- bgcolor="ffcccc"
| 21
| December 9
| Phoenix
| 
| Vince Carter (42)
| Keon Clark (15)
| Chris Childs (7)
| Air Canada Centre19,800
| 12–9
|- bgcolor="ffcccc"
| 22
| December 12
| @ San Antonio
| 
| Alvin Williams (16)
| Hakeem Olajuwon, Morris Peterson (6)
| Alvin Williams (7)
| Alamodome16,650
| 12–10
|- bgcolor="ffcccc"
| 23
| December 13
| @ Charlotte
| 
| Vince Carter (31)
| Keon Clark (9)
| Alvin Williams (7)
| Charlotte Coliseum9,791
| 12–11
|- bgcolor="ffcccc"
| 24
| December 16
| Washington
| 
| Vince Carter (23)
| Antonio Davis (14)
| Alvin Williams (8)
| Air Canada Centre20,048
| 12–12
|- bgcolor="bbffbb"
| 25
| December 19
| @ Indiana
| 
| Morris Peterson (29)
| Keon Clark (11)
| Vince Carter, Alvin Williams (6)
| Conseco Fieldhouse16,060
| 13–12
|- bgcolor="bbffbb"
| 26
| December 20
| Chicago
| 
| Vince Carter (33)
| Antonio Davis, Jerome Williams (11)
| Vince Carter (7)
| Air Canada Centre19,800
| 14–12
|- bgcolor="bbffbb"
| 27
| December 23
| Miami
| 
| Vince Carter (27)
| Vince Carter, Antonio Davis (10)
| Alvin Williams (7)
| Air Canada Centre19,800
| 15–12
|- bgcolor="ffcccc"
| 28
| December 25
| @ New York
| 
| Morris Peterson (22)
| Antonio Davis (11)
| Alvin Williams (5)
| Madison Square Garden19,763
| 15–13
|- bgcolor="bbffbb"
| 29
| December 28
| @ L.A. Lakers
| 
| Alvin Williams (17)
| Keon Clark (16)
| Alvin Williams (8)
| Staples Center18,997
| 16–13
|- bgcolor="ffcccc"
| 30
| December 29
| @ Seattle
| 
| Morris Peterson (18)
| Keon Clark (11)
| Alvin Williams (5)
| KeyArena17,072
| 16–14

|- bgcolor="bbffbb"
| 31
| January 2
| @ Portland
| 
| Vince Carter (28)
| Keon Clark, Antonio Davis (9)
| Chris Childs (9)
| Rose Garden18,117
| 17–14
|- bgcolor="bbffbb"
| 32
| January 4
| Cleveland
| 
| Vince Carter (34)
| Keon Clark (11)
| Vince Carter (8)
| Air Canada Centre19,800
| 18–14
|- bgcolor="ffcccc"
| 33
| January 6
| L.A. Lakers
| 
| Vince Carter (24)
| Eric Montross (8)
| Alvin Williams (6)
| Air Canada Centre19,800
| 18–15
|- bgcolor="ffcccc"
| 34
| January 8
| @ Memphis
| 
| Vince Carter (31)
| Antonio Davis (10)
| Chris Childs, Alvin Williams (6)
| Pyramid Arena14,323
| 18–16
|- bgcolor="bbffbb"
| 35
| January 9
| @ Chicago
| 
| Vince Carter (19)
| Antonio Davis (12)
| Chris Childs (10)
| United Center16,227
| 19–16
|- bgcolor="bbffbb"
| 36
| January 11
| Atlanta
| 
| Alvin Williams (28)
| Antonio Davis (13)
| Vince Carter (8)
| Air Canada Centre19,800
| 20–16
|- bgcolor="ffcccc"
| 37
| January 13
| L.A. Clippers
| 
| Vince Carter (31)
| Antonio Davis (17)
| Alvin Williams (4)
| Air Canada Centre19,800
| 20–17
|- bgcolor="bbffbb"
| 38
| January 15
| @ Detroit
| 
| Vince Carter (24)
| Vince Carter, Antonio Davis (9)
| Chris Childs (9)
| The Palace of Auburn Hills17,045
| 21–17
|- bgcolor="bbffbb"
| 39
| January 16
| Houston
| 
| Vince Carter (29)
| Jerome Williams (8)
| Alvin Williams (6)
| Air Canada Centre19,800
| 22–17
|- bgcolor="bbffbb"
| 40
| January 18
| New Jersey
| 
| Vince Carter (23)
| Keon Clark (13)
| Alvin Williams (7)
| Air Canada Centre19,800
| 23–17
|- bgcolor="bbffbb"
| 41
| January 19
| @ Charlotte
| 
| Vince Carter (34)
| Jerome Williams (10)
| Antonio Davis, Alvin Williams (5)
| Charlotte Coliseum16,593
| 24–17
|- bgcolor="ffcccc"
| 42
| January 21
| @ Boston
| 
| Vince Carter (26)
| Hakeem Olajuwon (10)
| Chris Childs (8)
| FleetCenter16,380
| 24–18
|- bgcolor="ffcccc"
| 43
| January 23
| New York
| 
| Alvin Williams (23)
| Antonio Davis (17)
| Chris Childs (7)
| Air Canada Centre19,800
| 24–19
|- bgcolor="bbffbb"
| 44
| January 25
| Minnesota
| 
| Vince Carter (19)
| Jerome Williams (13)
| Alvin Williams (7)
| Air Canada Centre19,800
| 25–19
|- bgcolor="bbffbb"
| 45
| January 27
| Orlando
| 
| Vince Carter (32)
| Antonio Davis (10)
| Chris Childs (9)
| Air Canada Centre19,800
| 26–19
|- bgcolor="bbffbb"
| 46
| January 31
| Boston
| 
| Vince Carter (27)
| Antonio Davis (13)
| Chris Childs (9)
| Air Canada Centre19,800
| 27–19

|- bgcolor="ffcccc"
| 47
| February 2
| @ New Jersey
| 
| Vince Carter (26)
| Antonio Davis (12)
| Chris Childs (5)
| Continental Airlines Arena20,049
| 27–20
|- bgcolor="bbffbb"
| 48
| February 4
| @ Philadelphia
| 
| Vince Carter (28)
| Antonio Davis (9)
| Vince Carter (6)
| First Union Center20,512
| 28–20
|- bgcolor="ffcccc"
| 49
| February 5
| @ Washington
| 
| Vince Carter (29)
| Antonio Davis (8)
| Chris Childs (11)
| MCI Center20,674
| 28–21
|- bgcolor="bbffbb"
| 50
| February 7
| San Antonio
| 
| Keon Clark (17)
| Keon Clark, Eric Montross (12)
| Alvin Williams (9)
| Air Canada Centre19,800
| 29–21
|- bgcolor="ffcccc"
| 51
| February 12
| @ Cleveland
| 
| Keon Clark (18)
| Eric Montross (12)
| Chris Childs (7)
| Gund Arena15,589
| 29–22
|- bgcolor="ffcccc"
| 52
| February 13
| @ New York
| 
| Keon Clark (26)
| Keon Clark (15)
| Alvin Williams (8)
| Madison Square Garden19,763
| 29–23
|- bgcolor="ffcccc"
| 53
| February 15
| Utah
| 
| Alvin Williams (26)
| Antonio Davis (8)
| Alvin Williams (7)
| Air Canada Centre19,800
| 29–24
|- bgcolor="ffcccc"
| 54
| February 17
| Milwaukee
| 
| Alvin Williams (24)
| Antonio Davis (17)
| Chris Childs (6)
| Air Canada Centre19,800
| 29–25
|- bgcolor="ffcccc"
| 55
| February 18
| @ Detroit
| 
| Antonio Davis (21)
| Antonio Davis (14)
| Chris Childs, Alvin Williams (5)
| The Palace of Auburn Hills18,491
| 29–26
|- bgcolor="ffcccc"
| 56
| February 20
| Charlotte
| 
| Antonio Davis (29)
| Antonio Davis (14)
| Alvin Williams (4)
| Air Canada Centre19,800
| 29–27
|- bgcolor="ffcccc"
| 57
| February 22
| Detroit
| 
| Antonio Davis (17)
| Antonio Davis (13)
| Alvin Williams (8)
| Air Canada Centre19,800
| 29–28
|- bgcolor="ffcccc"
| 58
| February 24
| Seattle
| 
| Vince Carter (28)
| Antonio Davis (12)
| Alvin Williams (14)
| Air Canada Centre19,800
| 29–29
|- bgcolor="ffcccc"
| 59
| February 27
| Orlando
| 
| Vince Carter (22)
| Antonio Davis (10)
| Alvin Williams (8)
| Air Canada Centre19,800
| 29–30

|- bgcolor="ffcccc"
| 60
| March 1
| Portland
| 
| Vince Carter (25)
| Antonio Davis, Hakeem Olajuwon (8)
| Chris Childs (7)
| Air Canada Centre19,800
| 29–31
|- bgcolor="ffcccc"
| 61
| March 3
| Philadelphia
| 
| Antonio Davis (26)
| Antonio Davis (9)
| Alvin Williams (6)
| Air Canada Centre19,800
| 29–32
|- bgcolor="ffcccc"
| 62
| March 5
| @ Houston
| 
| Vince Carter (43)
| Vince Carter, Hakeem Olajuwon (7)
| Alvin Williams (9)
| Compaq Center14,221
| 29–33
|- bgcolor="ffcccc"
| 63
| March 7
| @ Dallas
| 
| Vince Carter (19)
| Keon Clark, Antonio Davis (15)
| Alvin Williams (7)
| American Airlines Center19,945
| 29–34
|- bgcolor="bbffbb"
| 64
| March 8
| @ Miami
| 
| Antonio Davis (23)
| Antonio Davis (10)
| Chris Childs (6)
| American Airlines Arena16,500
| 30–34
|- bgcolor="ffcccc"
| 65
| March 10
| @ Orlando
| 
| Vince Carter (16)
| Antonio Davis (12)
| Chris Childs (7)
| TD Waterhouse Centre16,171
| 30–35
|- bgcolor="ffcccc"
| 66
| March 12
| @ New Jersey
| 
| Antonio Davis (27)
| Antonio Davis, Jerome Williams (13)
| Vince Carter (4)
| Continental Airlines Arena16,105
| 30–36
|- bgcolor="ffcccc"
| 67
| March 17
| Sacramento
| 
| Vince Carter (22)
| Hakeem Olajuwon (13)
| Chris Childs (7)
| Air Canada Centre19,800
| 30–37
|- bgcolor="ffcccc"
| 68
| March 19
| @ Minnesota
| 
| Morris Peterson (19)
| Antonio Davis (13)
| Alvin Williams (7)
| Target Center17,010
| 30–38
|- bgcolor="bbffbb"
| 69
| March 22
| @ Cleveland
| 
| Morris Peterson (18)
| Keon Clark (10)
| Alvin Williams (4)
| Gund Arena17,847
| 31–38
|- bgcolor="bbffbb"
| 70
| March 24
| Washington
| 
| Morris Peterson (26)
| Antonio Davis (9)
| Alvin Williams (9)
| Air Canada Centre19,800
| 32–38
|- bgcolor="bbffbb"
| 71
| March 27
| Miami
| 
| Morris Peterson (21)
| Antonio Davis, Jerome Williams (10)
| Chris Childs (6)
| Air Canada Centre19,800
| 33–38
|- bgcolor="bbffbb"
| 72
| March 28
| @ Atlanta
| 
| Antonio Davis, Morris Peterson (15)
| Antonio Davis (9)
| Chris Childs (7)
| Philips Arena12,036
| 34–38
|- bgcolor="bbffbb"
| 73
| March 31
| @ Philadelphia
| 
| Antonio Davis (16)
| Jerome Williams (9)
| Chris Childs (9)
| First Union Center20,650
| 35–38

|- bgcolor="bbffbb"
| 74
| April 3
| Chicago
| 
| Morris Peterson (26)
| Antonio Davis (13)
| Alvin Williams (10)
| Air Canada Centre19,800
| 36–38
|- bgcolor="bbffbb"
| 75
| April 5
| @ Chicago
| 
| Antonio Davis (27)
| Keon Clark (10)
| Chris Childs (8)
| United Center19,352
| 37–38
|- bgcolor="bbffbb"
| 76
| April 7
| Indiana
| 
| Alvin Williams (26)
| Antonio Davis (10)
| Chris Childs (8)
| Air Canada Centre19,800
| 38–38
|- bgcolor="bbffbb"
| 77
| April 9
| Charlotte
| 
| Antonio Davis (24)
| Jerome Williams (8)
| Antonio Davis, Morris Peterson (7)
| Air Canada Centre19,800
| 39–38
|- bgcolor="ffcccc"
| 78
| April 10
| @ Indiana
| 
| Antonio Davis (24)
| Antonio Davis (9)
| Alvin Williams (6)
| Conseco Fieldhouse16,337
| 39–39
|- bgcolor="bbffbb"
| 79
| April 12
| Atlanta
| 
| Keon Clark, Jerome Williams (20)
| Michael Bradley, Keon Clark, Jerome Williams (6)
| Jermaine Jackson (11)
| Air Canada Centre19,800
| 40–39
|- bgcolor="bbffbb"
| 80
| April 14
| New Jersey
| 
| Morris Peterson (24)
| Keon Clark (9)
| Jermaine Jackson (9)
| Air Canada Centre19,800
| 41–39
|- bgcolor="ffcccc"
| 81
| April 16
| @ Milwaukee
| 
| Morris Peterson (23)
| Antonio Davis, Jerome Williams (6)
| Chris Childs, Alvin Williams (5)
| Bradley Center17,086
| 41–40
|- bgcolor="bbffbb"
| 82
| April 17
| Cleveland
| 
| Morris Peterson, Jerome Williams (22)
| Jerome Williams (12)
| Alvin Williams (8)
| Air Canada Centre19,800
| 42–40

Playoffs

Game log

|- align="center" bgcolor="#ffcccc"
| 1
| April 21
| @ Detroit
| L 63–85
| Antonio Davis (15)
| Antonio Davis (14)
| Alvin Williams (6)
| The Palace of Auburn Hills22,076
| 0–1
|- align="center" bgcolor="#ffcccc"
| 2
| April 24
| @ Detroit
| L 91–96
| Chris Childs (22)
| Antonio Davis (14)
| Chris Childs (14)
| The Palace of Auburn Hills22,076
| 0–2
|- align="center" bgcolor="#ccffcc"
| 3
| April 27
| Detroit
| W 94–84
| Antonio Davis (30)
| Antonio Davis (8)
| Chris Childs (10)
| Air Canada Centre20,138
| 1–2
|- align="center" bgcolor="#ccffcc"
| 4
| April 29
| Detroit
| W 89–83
| Morris Peterson (20)
| Keon Clark (16)
| Alvin Williams (9)
| Air Canada Centre20,112
| 2–2
|- align="center" bgcolor="#ffcccc"
| 5
| May 2
| @ Detroit
| L 82–85
| Dell Curry (17)
| Antonio Davis (12)
| Childs, Williams (6)
| The Palace of Auburn Hills22,076
| 2–3

Player statistics

Regular season

* Statistics include only games with the Raptors

Playoffs

Award winners
 Vince Carter, NBA All-Star Game selection, Starter (did not play due to an injury)
 Morris Peterson, NBA Rookie-Sophomore All-Star Game selection [Sophomore] (did not play due to an injury)

Transactions

References

External links
 
 

Toronto Raptors seasons
Toronto
Tor